Mitchel Ray Jacoby (born December 8, 1973) is a former American football player. He played professionally as a tight end in the National Football League (NFL) for three seasons, two with the St. Louis Rams before playing his final season with the Kansas City Chiefs.

References

1973 births
Living people
American football tight ends
Kansas City Chiefs players
Northern Illinois Huskies football players
St. Louis Rams players
People from Fredonia, Wisconsin
People from Port Washington, Wisconsin
Sportspeople from the Milwaukee metropolitan area
Players of American football from Wisconsin